The Pioneer Venus Orbiter, also known as Pioneer Venus 1 or Pioneer 12, was a mission to Venus conducted by NASA as part of the Pioneer Venus project. Launched in May 1978 atop an Atlas-Centaur rocket, the spacecraft was inserted into an elliptical orbit around Venus on December 4, 1978. It returned data from Venus until October 1992.

Launch and arrival at Venus

The Pioneer Venus Orbiter was launched by an Atlas SLV-3D Centaur-D1AR rocket, which flew from Launch Complex 36A at the Cape Canaveral Air Force Station. The launch occurred at 13:13:00 on May 20, 1978, and deployed the Orbiter into heliocentric orbit for its coast to Venus. Venus orbit insertion occurred on December 4, 1978.

Spacecraft

Manufactured by Hughes Aircraft Company, the Pioneer Venus Orbiter was based on the HS-507 bus. All instruments and spacecraft subsystems were mounted on the forward end of the cylinder, except the magnetometer, which was at the end of a  boom. A solar array extended around the circumference of the cylinder. A  despun dish antenna provided S and X band communication with Earth. A Star-24 solid rocket motor was integrated into the spacecraft to provide the thrust to enter orbit around Venus.

In 1991, the Radar Mapper was reactivated to investigate previously inaccessible southern portions of the planet, in conjunction with the recently arrived Magellan spacecraft. The spacecraft continued to return data until 8 October 1992, with the last signals being received at 19:22 UTC. The Pioneer Venus Orbiter disintegrated upon entering the atmosphere of Venus on October 22, 1992.

Experiments

The Pioneer Venus Orbiter carried 17 experiments with a total mass of :

a cloud photo-polarimeter (OCPP) to measure the vertical distribution of the clouds, similar to Pioneer 10 and Pioneer 11 imaging photo-polarimeter (IPP)
a surface radar mapper (ORAD) to determine topography and surface characteristics. A 20 watt S-band signal (1.757 gigahertz) was sent to the surface that reflected it, with the probe analyzing the echo.
an infrared radiometer (OIR) to measure IR emissions from Venus' atmosphere
an airglow ultraviolet spectrometer (OUVS) to measure scattered and emitted UV light
a neutral mass spectrometer (ONMS) to determine the composition of the upper atmosphere
a solar wind plasma analyzer (OPA) to measure properties of the solar wind
a magnetometer (OMAG) to characterize the magnetic field at Venus
an electric field detector (OEFD) to study the solar wind and its interactions
an electron temperature  (OETP) to study the thermal properties of the ionosphere
an ion mass spectrometer (OIMS) to characterize the ionospheric ion population
a charged particle retarding potential analyzer (ORPA) to study ionospheric particles
two radio science experiments to determine the gravity field of Venus
a radio occultation experiment to characterize the atmosphere
an atmospheric drag experiment to study the upper atmosphere
a radio science atmospheric and solar wind turbulence experiment
a gamma ray burst (OGBD) detector to record gamma ray burst events

The spacecraft conducted radar altimetry observations allowing the first global topographic map of the Venusian surface to be constructed.

Observations of Halley's Comet 
From its orbit of Venus, the Pioneer Venus Orbiter was able to observe Halley's Comet when it was unobservable from Earth due to its proximity to the sun during February 1986. UV spectrometer observations monitored the loss of water from the comet's nucleus at perihelion on February 9.

See also

 Pioneer Venus Multiprobe
 List of missions to Venus
 Timeline of artificial satellites and space probes

References

External links 

NASA: Pioneer Venus Project Information
Pioneer Venus Program Page by NASA's Solar System Exploration
Kasprzak, W. T – The Pioneer Venus Orbiter: 11 years of data. (May 1, 1990) – NASA

Science Magazine in year 1979 issue 4401 
 
 
 
 
 
 
 
 
 
 
 
 
 
 
 
 
 
 
 
 
 
 
 
 
 
 
 
 
 
 
 
 
 
 
 
 
 
 
 
 
 
 
 
 
 
 
 
 
 
 
 
 
 
 
 
 
 
 
 
 

1978 in spaceflight
Missions to Venus
Pioneer program
Spacecraft launched by Atlas-Centaur rockets
Destroyed space probes
Spacecraft launched in 1978